Surapadma or Surapadman is an asura featured in Hindu literature. He is the son of the sage Kashyapa and a shakti named Maya. He wages war against the devas by invading Devaloka with a massive army. He is defeated by Murugan, and according to Tamil tradition, turned into his vahana, the peacock. He is the brother of Tarakasura. His eldest son is Banukopan.

Legend
The Kanda Puranam, the Tamil iteration of the Skanda Purana, describes the legend of Surapadma. He is said to have engaged in intense austerities to propitiate the deity Shiva, who appeared to grant the asura a boon. He asked for the boon of living for 108 yugas, and reign over the 1008 worlds. He marries Padmakomalai, with whom he sired several sons, the eldest of whom is Banukopan. Establishing his capital at a city named Viramakendiram located at the eastern sea, he ruled the world. An enemy of the devas, he starts to harass them, and attacks a number of Indra's sons. He also desires Indrani, the wife of Indra. When Indra and his wife fled to the earth, Murugan sends his messenger named Viravakutevar to urge Surapadma to cease his activities, but to no avail. Murugan declares war on Surapadma, and in the ensuing battle, all of the latter's sons except Iraniyan are slain. Unwilling to concede his defeat, Surapadma retreated to the sea, assuming the form of a mango tree. Murugan slices the tree in twain, from which emerges a cock and a peacock. The deity starts to employ the cock as his battle standard, and the peacock as his mount. 

Tiruchendur is identified by adherents as the site Surapadma is slain by Murugan.

In Tamil tradition, Surapadma is conceived with the same origin as Tarakasura, the asura who necessitates the birth of a son of Shiva, Murugan. The slaying of Surapadma by Murugan is also described to mark the onset of the Kali Yuga. The downfall of Surapadma is the legend behind the occasion of the festival of  Thaipusam.

See also

 Tarakasura
 Jalandhara
 Banasura

References

External links
http://www.murugan.org/gallery/kanda_puranam/html/kp_12.htm
http://murugan.org/gallery/kanda_puranam/html/kp_17.htm
http://tiruchendur.org/das-article.htm

Asura
Hindu mythology
Characters in Hindu mythology